Phosphatidylinositol 4,5-bisphosphate or PtdIns(4,5)P2, also known simply as PIP2 or PI(4,5)P2, is a minor phospholipid component of cell membranes. PtdIns(4,5)P2 is enriched at the plasma membrane where it is a substrate for a number of important signaling proteins. PIP2 also forms lipid clusters that sort proteins. 

PIP2 is formed primarily by the type I phosphatidylinositol 4-phosphate 5-kinases from PI(4)P. In metazoans, PIP2 can also be formed by type II phosphatidylinositol 5-phosphate 4-kinases from PI(5)P.

The fatty acids of PIP2 are variable in different species and tissues, but the most common fatty acids are stearic in position 1 and arachidonic in 2.

Signaling pathways 
PIP2 is a part of many cellular signaling pathways, including PIP2 cycle, PI3K signalling, and PI5P metabolism. Recently, it has been found in  the nucleus with unknown function.

Functions

Cytoskeleton dynamics near membranes 
PIP2 regulates the organization, polymerization, and branching of filamentous actin (F-actin) via direct binding to F-actin regulatory proteins.

Endocytosis and exocytosis 
The first evidence that indicated phosphoinositides(PIs) (especially PI(4,5)P2) are important during the exocytosis process was in 1990. Emberhard et al.
 
found that the application of PI-specific phospholipase C into digitonin-permeabilized chromaffin cells decreased PI levels, and inhibited calcium-triggered exocytosis. This exocytosis inhibition was preferential for an ATP-dependent stage, indicating PI function was required for secretion. Later studies identified associated proteins necessary during this stage, such as phosphatidylinositol transfer protein
, and phosphoinositol-4-monophosphatase 5 kinase type Iγ (PIPKγ)
, 
which mediates PI(4,5)P2 restoration in permeable cell incubation in an ATP-dependent way. In these later studies, PI(4,5)P2 specific antibodies strongly inhibited exocytosis, thus providing direct evidence that PI(4,5)P2 plays a pivotal role during the LDCV (Large dense core vesicle) exocytosis process.

Through the use of PI-specific kinase/phosphatase identification and PI antibody/drug/blocker discovery, the role of PI (especially PI(4,5)P2) in secretion regulation was extensively investigated. Studies utilizing PHPLCδ1 domain over-expression (acting as PI(4,5)P2 buffer or blocker)
, PIPKIγ knockout in chromaffin cell
 and in central nerve system, PIPKIγ knockdown in beta cell lines
, and over-expression of membrane-tethered inositol 5-phosphatase domain of synaptojanin 1
, all suggested vesicle (synaptic vesicle and LDCV) secretion were severely impaired after PI(4,5)P2 depletion or blockage. Moreover, some studies showed an impaired/reduced RRP of those vesicles, though the docked vesicle number were not altered after PI(4,5)P2 depletion, indicating a defect at a pre-fusion stage (priming stage). Follow-up studies indicated that PI(4,5)P2 interactions with CAPS, Munc13 and synaptotagmin1 are likely to play a role in this PI(4,5)P2 dependent priming defect.

IP3/DAG pathway
PIP2 functions as an intermediate in the IP3/DAG pathway, which is initiated by ligands binding to G protein-coupled receptors activating the Gq alpha subunit. PtdIns(4,5)P2 is a substrate for hydrolysis by phospholipase C (PLC), a membrane-bound enzyme activated through protein receptors such as α1 adrenergic receptors.  PIP2 regulates the function of many membrane proteins and ion channels, such as the M-channel.  The products of the PLC catalyzation of PIP2 are inositol 1,4,5-trisphosphate (InsP3; IP3) and diacylglycerol (DAG), both of which function as second messengers. In this cascade, DAG remains on the cell membrane and activates the signal cascade by activating protein kinase C (PKC). PKC in turn activates other cytosolic proteins by phosphorylating them. The effect of PKC could be reversed by phosphatases. IP3 enters the cytoplasm and activates IP3 receptors on the smooth endoplasmic reticulum (ER), which opens calcium channels on the smooth ER, allowing mobilization of calcium ions through specific Ca2+ channels into the cytosol. Calcium participates in the cascade by activating other proteins.

Docking phospholipids

Class I PI 3-kinases phosphorylate PtdIns(4,5)P2 forming phosphatidylinositol (3,4,5)-trisphosphate (PtdIns(3,4,5)P3) and PtdIns(4,5)P2 can be converted from PtdIns4P. PtdIns4P, PtdIns(3,4,5)P3 and PtdIns(4,5)P2 not only act as substrates for enzymes but also serve as docking phospholipids that bind specific domains that promote the recruitment of proteins to the plasma membrane and subsequent activation of signaling cascades.

Examples of proteins activated by PtdIns(3,4,5)P3 are Akt, PDPK1, Btk1.
One mechanism for direct effect of PtdIns(4,5)P2 is opening of Na+ channels as a minor function in growth hormone release by growth hormone-releasing hormone.

Potassium channels
Inwardly rectifying potassium channels have been shown to require docking of PIP2 for channel activity.

G protein-coupled receptors 
PtdIns(4,5)P2 has been shown to stabilize the active states of Class A G protein-coupled receptors (GPCRs) via direct binding, and enhance their selectivity toward certain G proteins.

G protein-coupled receptor kinases 
PIP2 has been shown to recruit G protein-coupled receptor kinase 2 (GRK2) to the membrane by binding to the large lobe of GRK2.  This stabilizes GRK2 and also orients it in a way that allows for more efficient phosphorylation of the beta adrenergic receptor, a type of GPCR.

Regulation
PIP2 is regulated by many different components. One emerging hypothesis is that PIP2 concentration is maintained locally. Some of the factors involved in PIP2 regulation are: 
 Lipid kinases, Lipid Phosphatase
 Lipid Transfer Proteins
 Growth Factors, Small GTPases
 Cell Attachment
 Cell-Cell Interaction
 Change in cell volume
 Cell differentiation state
 Cell stress

References

Phospholipids